In the United Kingdom, Christmas number ones are singles that are top of the UK Singles Chart in the week in which Christmas Day falls. The singles have often been novelty songs, charity songs or songs with a Christmas theme. Historically, the volume of record sales in the UK has peaked at Christmas. The Christmas number one is considered especially prestigious, more so than any other time of year. Christmas number one singles have often also been the best-selling song of the year, though in recent years, the accolade has gone to reality television contestants and charity efforts. Due to the common practice of dating a chart by the date on which the week ends, the Christmas chart is dated the end of the week containing 25 December. The most recent Christmas number one single on The Official Big Top 40 is "Christmas Drillings" by Sidemen.

The following is a list of Christmas number ones on The Official Big Top 40.

List

References

 
Christmas
UK 1